Vũ Thị Mến (born 10 July 1990 in Nam Định) is a Vietnamese triple jumper.

At the 2013 Southeast Asian Games she finished fourth in the triple jump and fifth in the long jump. She won the triple jump gold medal at the 2017 Southeast Asian Games and the bronze medal at the 2018 Asian Games.

Her personal best jump is 14.15 metres, achieved at the 2017 Southeast Asian Games in Kuala Lumpur. This is the Vietnamese record.

References

1990 births
Living people
Vietnamese triple jumpers
Vietnamese female long jumpers
Athletes (track and field) at the 2018 Asian Games
Asian Games bronze medalists for Vietnam
Asian Games medalists in athletics (track and field)
Medalists at the 2018 Asian Games
Competitors at the 2019 Southeast Asian Games
Southeast Asian Games bronze medalists for Vietnam
Southeast Asian Games medalists in athletics
21st-century Vietnamese women